Metipranolol (OptiPranolol, Betanol, Disorat, Trimepranol) is a non-selective beta blocker used in eye drops to treat glaucoma.  It is rapidly metabolized into desacetylmetipranolol.

References 

Beta blockers
N-isopropyl-phenoxypropanolamines
Acetate esters
Isopropylamino compounds
Phenol esters
Ophthalmology drugs